The Red Napoleon is a 1929 novel by Floyd Gibbons predicting a Soviet conquest of Europe and invasion of America. The novel contains strong racial overtones such as expressed fear of the yellow peril and of inter-racial breeding. However, the characters expressing these views are exposed in the text as being bigoted and ill-informed, as is one of the main U.S. character's views of the Soviet Union's free-love-but-with-male-accountability laws.

The Red Napoleon was published in 1929 and projects the next few years.  In it, Joseph Stalin is killed by an assassin in 1932. A Red Army leader takes over and starts a massive military buildup based on the immense human population of Asia. In 1933 the Red Army invades Poland. After conquering all of Europe later that same year, Red Napoleon's massive multi-racial army attempts to invade the U.S. but is repelled through canny use of the U.S.'s comparatively slender military resources, including airfields in Cuba, at the time of writing under U.S. control, and through grit and determination. At the book's end the narrator, a newspaperman like the author himself, interviews the imprisoned Red Napoleon, who defends his policy of non-racialism, of inter-mixing the races of the world, saying it must be the way of the future.

John Gardner in his afterword to the 1976 edition stated:

"What Gibbons is saying from behind the fortress-wall of his trash-writer gimmicks, is serious and convincing: white superiority on this planet is finished, and, worse, if we refuse to meet the Third World halfway - refuse to shuck off the racial prejudice that has been a standard feature of our character from the beginning - we face virtual extermination...
Gibbons found himself in a curious position [when he wrote Red Napoleon in the 1920s]... Everything he believed most profoundly - and believed to be a matter of life and death - would be anathema to his readers. Not only would the vast majority of his readership find his visionary slogan ridiculous - "We recognize but one race - the HUMAN RACE" - they would find it grossly evil...[so Gibbons made every one of the novel's favourable characters into thorough-going bigots..."
while, Gardner points out, all the evil done by the novel's main antagonist Karakhan of Kazan "has been done before by white against nonwhites... even the novel's sympathetic characters can at least glimpse the reason" for his actions -a history of being "renters and hopeless wage slaves ... [is] some reason for revolution...
Out of the cheapest and ugliest cliches of the trash literature of his time, Gibbons has shaped an ironic satire of capitalist America's greed and foolhardy racism."  (p. 378-81)

Publication history
The Red Napoleon first appeared as an illustrated 18-part serial in Liberty magazine, from April 6 through August 3, 1929.

In August 1929, the novel was published in hardcover by the new New York firm of Jonathan Cape & Harrison Smith.

In 1976, the novel was reissued by the Southern Illinois University Press, part of their Lost American Fiction series, with an afterword by John Gardner. Popular Library published the mass market counterpart in 1977.

See also
Invasion literature

References

External links
"Mongol Hordes Take Manhattan: Before there was Red Dawn, there was Red Napoleon" by J.M. Berger, Foreign Policy, November 21, 2012

1929 American novels
Invasion literature
1929 speculative fiction novels